Dunbrack Street is a  arterial road in Mainland Halifax, Nova Scotia. It runs from Route 306 (Old Sambro Road) in Spryfield to Kearney Lake Road in Rockingham. Prior to 2019, Dunbrack Street ran from Kearney Lake Road in Rockingham to Main Avenue in Fairview. The remaining section was named Northwest Arm Drive until 2019. The former Northwest Arm section is assigned Trunk 32 by the provincial transportation department as an unsigned highway.

Dunbrack Street is named for Roy Dunbrack, who was a surveyor for the city of Halifax, Nova Scotia. The Halifax Dunbrack Soccer Club is named after the street.

Northwest Arm Drive
The North West Arm Drive was a  four-lane expressway in Halifax that ran from Main Avenue connecting Fairview to Route 306 (Old Sambro Road), connecting to Highway 102 and Trunk 3.  The highway was a stub of the incomplete "Harbour Drive" project which would have connected Highway 102 with the Halifax waterfront, via a bridge over the Northwest Arm and a 6-lane highway through the south end along Water Street and along Barrington past Cogswell. The project was cancelled in the 1970s in the wake of public opposition, but not before North West Arm Drive and the Cogswell Street Interchange were completed. On April 29, 2019, the Halifax Regional Municipality renamed it to Dunbrack Street.

History
Construction of North West Arm Drive by the provincial Department of Highways began in 1975/76. Work on the four-lane road, stretching from Dunbrack Street to the Old Sambro Road, was completed in 1977/78.

Major intersections

References

Roads in Halifax, Nova Scotia
Nova Scotia provincial highways